Fetal trimethadione syndrome (also known as paramethadione syndrome, German syndrome, tridione syndrome, among others) is a set of birth defects caused by the administration of the anticonvulsants trimethadione (also known as Tridione) or paramethadione to epileptic mothers during pregnancy.

Fetal trimethadione syndrome is classified as a rare disease by the National Institute of Health's Office of Rare Diseases, meaning it affects less than 200,000 individuals in the United States.

The fetal loss rate while using trimethadione has been reported to be as high as 87%.

Presentation 
Fetal trimethadione syndrome is characterized by the following major symptoms as a result of the teratogenic characteristics of trimethadione.
 Cranial and facial abnormalities which include; microcephaly, midfacial flattening, V-shaped eyebrows and a short nose
 Cardiovascular abnormalities
 Absent kidney and ureter
 Meningocele, a birth defect of the spine
 Omphalocele, a birth defect where portions of the abdominal contents project into the umbilical cord
 A delay in mental and physical development

Diagnosis

Treatment
Surgery may help alleviate the effects of some physical defects, but prognosis is poor, especially for those with severe cardiovascular and cognitive problems. Speech and physical therapy, as well as special education, is required for surviving children.

References

External links 

Rare syndromes
Congenital disorders